Mujhse Shaadi Karoge ( Will you marry me?) is an Indian reality television series that premiered on 17 February 2020 on Colors TV. Hosted by Gautam Gulati (formerly Manish Paul), starring Paras Chhabra and Shehnaaz Kaur Gill who try to find a suitable life partner for themselves from among the contestants. On 17 March 2020, Endemol Shine India announced that they are voluntarily suspending all their administrative and production departments until further notice due to the global COVID-19 pandemic, for minimizing the spread and to comply with the safety and precautionary measures suggested by the government. It is also in the wake of decision by Federation of Western India Cine Employees (FWICE) and Indian Film & Television Directors' Association (IFTDA) to hold shootings of film, TV shows and web series from 19 March to June 2020. Hence the show had to end before the original off air date. Reportedly the reason for Shehnaz Kaur Gill 's early exit and demand to leave the show was her love for Sidhath Shukla - The winner of BiggBoss 13.

Concept 
In the auditions, Paras Chhabra and Shehnaaz Kaur Gill chose five contestants each who they want to get to know better. Both of them will be locked in a house with their five suitors. Over a period of 13 weeks, they will try to find their life partner which later on was cut short to 25 days.

Housemates Status

Relatives

Contestants

Original Contestants

Wild Card Contestants 
Shehnaaz

Shehzada &
Tehraan Bakshi

Paras

Aanchal Khurana &
Shivani Jha

Nominations table 

  Indicates contestants who have came for Shehnaaz
  Indicates contestants who have came for Paras
  Indicates that the Contestant was directly nominated for elimination.
  Indicates that the Contestant was immune prior to nominations.
  Indicates the contestant has been eliminated.
  Indicates the contestant walked out  to emergency.
  Indicates the contestant has been ejected by housemates.

References 

Colors TV original programming
2020 Indian television series debuts
Dating and relationship reality television series